The New Zealand Breakers (also known as the Sky Sport Breakers for sponsorship reasons) are a New Zealand professional basketball team based in Auckland. The Breakers compete in the National Basketball League (NBL) and play their home games at multiple venues, mainly Spark Arena. The team was founded in 2003 and remains the only team in the league to compete from New Zealand and are one of two teams (the other being the now-absent Singapore Slingers) from outside of Australia to have competed in the NBL. In 2011, the Breakers won their first NBL Championship and successfully defended it in 2012 and 2013, claiming the second three-peat in NBL history. They won their fourth title in 2015.

The Breakers were owned by Liz and Paul Blackwell from 2005 to 2018 when a consortium headed by former NBA player Matt Walsh became the majority shareholders via a newly formed company called Breakers Basketball Ltd.

History

Early years
In March 2003, a New Zealand basketball team was confirmed to be entering the Australian National Basketball League in the 2003–04 season. Three Waikato businessmen, Michael Redman, Dallas Fisher and Keith Ward, were persuaded to start the Breakers franchise.

After a 111–110 victory over the Adelaide 36ers in the first ever regular season match, the Breakers went on to lose ten of their next eleven games to languish near the bottom of the NBL ladder. The inaugural coach, Jeff Green, was subsequently fired and succeeded by Frank Arsego, who was initially an assistant coach. The addition of Mike Chappell breathed new life into the Breakers season. After languishing with a 2–10 record, the Breakers experienced a mid-season resurgence, capped off by a five-match winning streak towards the end of the season which gave them a realistic shot of qualifying for the playoffs. Needing to win both of their final games in the final week of the regular season to claim a playoff berth, the Breakers lost both to finished 10th with a 12–21 record.

In 2004–05, the Breakers finished in last place in the eleven-team league with a 9–23 record. In the 2005 off-season, the Breakers appointed Andrej Lemanis as coach and signed import Rich Melzer. Lemanis' first season in charge was not particularly memorable, with the Breakers finishing the regular season in tenth place out of 11 teams, once again with a 9–23 record. During the season, the Breakers endured a team-worst eleven straight losses. However, Melzer and centre Ben Pepper turned the season around as steady contributions from import Brian Green and Kiwi Aaron Olson helped the Breakers split their final twelve games of the season.

The Breakers struggled in the 2006–07 season, finishing with an 11–22 record after a ten-game losing streak halted the Breakers chances of qualifying for the playoffs. American import Carlos Powell was a bright spot on the season, averaging a league-high 28.2 points per game. His 50-point haul against the Melbourne Tigers was the best individual points haul of the season and he also claimed the Slam Dunk crown at the NBL All-Star weekend. He also snared two NBL Player of the Month Awards and was in the running for league MVP honors with Sam Mackinnon (winner) and Martin Cattalini.

With Kirk Penney on board for the 2007–08 season, the Breakers looked to make the playoffs for the first time. Despite season-ending injuries to imports Rick Rickert and Wayne Turner, their replacements Derrick Alston and Orien Greene helped the Breakers seal their maiden NBL playoff berth with a 16–14 record. In their first playoff match, they defeated the Cairns Taipans in Cairns 100–78 to set up another elimination final against the defending champion Brisbane Bullets. However, this proved a bridge too far for the Breakers, defeated in Brisbane to bring the curtain down on their season.

Prior to the 2008–09 season, the collapse of the Brisbane Bullets saw the Breakers nab C. J. Bruton and Dillon Boucher. The Breakers started the 2008–09 season with a roar, sitting atop the NBL ladder with a 15–4 record heading into 2009. Bruton and Penney were a dominant backcourt duo, however, after Bruton suffered a high ankle sprain in late December, the Breakers stumbled through January to lose eight of their next nine games. After a successful last week of the regular season, the Breakers finished with an 18–12 record, setting the team up with their first ever home playoff game. The Breakers went on to win their elimination playoff, routing the Adelaide 36ers 131–101 to set up a best-of-three semi-final series with the defending champion Melbourne Tigers. In their first ever semi-finals appearance, the Breakers were beaten 2–0.

The Breakers were dealt a blow early on in the 2009–10 season with Penney suffering a back injury that sidelined him for nine games. The mid-season addition of import Kevin Braswell sparked a late-season flurry, with the Breakers winning their last six matches to finish with a 15–13 record. But the late-season winning run proved to be in vain, as the Breakers missed the playoffs despite finishing just two wins off minor premiers and eventual champions, the Perth Wildcats.

Championship dynasty

Three-peat (2010–2013)

In 2010, the Breakers re-added Mika Vukona to their ranks, whilst adding former Utah State standout Gary Wilkinson to the mix alongside the returning Kevin Braswell. However, Penney was missing during pre-season and early on the regular season as he attempted to re-enter the NBA. The Breakers won their first five games of the season before losing 114–74 to the Wildcats in Perth. The Breakers finished the regular season with a 22–6 record, qualifying for the playoffs as the first seed. In the semi-finals, the Breakers lost Game 1 to the Perth Wildcats at home, before recovering to win the series 2–1, qualifying for their first ever NBL Grand Final. The Breakers met the Cairns Taipans in the championship round and coasted to an 85–67 win in Game 1 after leading by as much as 31 in the third-quarter. The teams then fought out a gripping Game 2 in Cairns. Tied 60–60 at the end of regulation and 73–73 at the end of the first overtime, it was Cairns who prevailed 85–81 to send the series to a third and deciding game. Back at home for Game 3 on 29 April 2011, the Breakers recorded a comfortable 71–53 win to claim their maiden NBL Championship, becoming the first New Zealand side to win a major Australian championship.

With Penney departing in 2011, the Breakers signed former NBA player Cedric Jackson and picked up Daryl Corletto for the 2011–12 season. Behind the likes of Jackson, Wilkinson, Abercrombie, Vukona, Bruton and Corletto, the Breakers clinched the minor premiership for the second year in a row with a 21–7 record and reached their second consecutive NBL Grand Final, where they faced the Perth Wildcats. They went on to clinch back-to-back titles with a 79–73 win in Game 3 of the championship round.

The 2012 off-season saw the departure of Gary Wilkinson and the elevation of promising New Zealand centre Alex Pledger to the starting line-up, while guard Corey Webster returned to the squad after a 12-month ban for the use of banned substances. In February 2013, the Breakers extend their club-best winning streak to 11, a record that by mid-March had been extended to fifteen straight games and coincided with the Breakers winning their third straight minor premiership. The Breakers completed an historic title three-peat in the NBL in April, making a clean sweep of the post-season with a dramatic 70–66 victory over the Wildcats in Game 2 of the 2013 NBL Grand Final series.

Fall from grace (2013–14)
With Lemanis' departure following the 2012–13 season, Dean Vickerman was appointed coach of the Breakers for the 2013–14 season. Further losses in 2013 included Cedric Jackson's departure and Dillon Boucher's retirement. The Breakers moved quickly to make changes to their roster after a start to the season that saw them win one and lose three games, announcing the return of club favourite and two-time championship winner Gary Wilkinson in late October. By January, the Breakers brought in Casey Frank to replace the injured Alex Pledger, who had multiple stints on the sidelines in 2013–14.

American guard Kerron Johnson struggled to fill the large gap left by Jackson, and Thomas Abercrombie had to shoulder the load for much of the season, finding himself with a lack of space due to Johnson's lack-luster range. After not being able to put more than two consecutive wins together all year, they ended their season in seventh place with an 11–17 record.

Fourth championship (2014–15)

With the return of Cedric Jackson and the signing of Ekene Ibekwe came the turn around the Breakers needed following the 2013–14 season. Following an impressive showing at the NBL Pre-season Blitz, the Breakers went on to fight for top spot all season alongside Perth and Cairns as they eventually finished second with a record of 19–9. With third place falling to the Adelaide 36ers (who won the final 10 regular season games and came into the playoffs as the hottest team), the Breakers faced off against them in a best-of-three semi-final series. Despite the 36ers' form, the Breakers easily handled them in Game 1 as they won 111–82 in convincing fashion at Vector Arena. Game 2 then moved to Adelaide where they again had the upper hand the entire game, defeating the 36ers 94–83 to book themselves a place in the 2015 NBL Grand Final. Despite their opponent, the Cairns Taipans, holding home court advantage, the Breakers easily took Game 1 in Cairns with an 86–71 win led by Jackson's 22 points. Game 2 then shifted to Auckland, where after a tight contest the entire game, Taipans guard Scottie Wilbekin tied the game with two free throws with 1.2 seconds left in regulation. Coming out of a timeout, Ibekwe caught an inbounds pass, turned and hit a game-winning fade-away shot to lift the Breakers over the Taipans 83–81 to clinch the team's fourth title in five seasons. Jackson was subsequently named Grand Final MVP for the second time in his career after adding to his 22 points in Game 1 with 15 points in Game 2.

Fifth grand final in six years (2015–16)
The Breakers retained every player from their 2014–15 championship-winning roster minus Ekene Ibekwe and Rhys Carter. To replace the pair, the club picked up Australian point guard Shane McDonald and rookie American big man Charles Jackson. The Breakers' pre-season preparation was rocked in September with the departure of Webster and an injury to Abercrombie. Webster left the team to chase his NBA dream with the New Orleans Pelicans, while Abercrombie was forced to the sidelines to nurse a nagging hamstring strain. Big man Alex Pledger was also another notable absentee from pre-season training as he recovered from off-season foot surgery. To counter their losses, the team signed Everard Bartlett and elevated development players Shea Ili and Tai Wynyard, as the Breakers brought an undermanned side to the 2015 NBL Pre-season Blitz.

The Breakers were handed a shock loss in their season opener, going down 90–71 to the Adelaide 36ers in Adelaide. At half-time, the score was 51–26 in the 36ers favour. 26 points marked the second lowest first-half score in the team's history, and the second biggest half-time deficit. Still without Webster, Abercrombie and Pledger, the Breakers had limited scoring options, with the highest scorer being Cedric Jackson with 14 points. After winning their second game of the season against the Townsville Crocodiles 89–81 at home, their following game should have been a celebration of Cedric Jackson's fantastic career with his 100th NBL game being played at the WIN Entertainment Centre against the Illawarra Hawks. However, the Breakers were blown out 96–75 thanks to former club champion Kirk Penney scoring 36 points for the Hawks. Jackson's performance in his 100th game was indicative to the score, as he went 0-of-7 from the field, 0-of-3 from three-point range, and 1-of-5 from the free throw line. The Breakers also committed 25 turnovers, a club record in a 40-minute game. Their following game against the Perth Wildcats also turned in another loss, dropping them to a record of 1–3 over the first two rounds, having lost all three road games. With a dwindling record, the Breakers were happy to welcome back NBA prospect Corey Webster. The high scoring guard returned to Auckland on 17 October after failing to secure a roster spot with the Pelicans. As a result of Webster returning, forward Duane Bailey was released by the club, while guard replacement Everard Bartlett was retained for the rest of the season. With Webster back in the line-up, the Breakers went on a three-game winning streak to head into Round 5 with a 4–3 record. On 8 November, the Breakers were defeated by Melbourne United in a controversial final quarter which saw an unsportsmanlike foul call on Webster in the closing seconds, denying the Breakers a chance at stopping United's unbeaten record.

After starting the season 1–3, the Breakers won nine of their next 11 games to breeze back into the championship mix with a 10–5 record after Round 10. However, the Breakers went on to lose five of their next six games to slip behind the fourth-placed Adelaide 36ers (11–9) at the conclusion of Round 15 with an 11–10 record. On 21 January, the Breakers lost their fifth straight game, the team's worst losing streak since the 2008–09 season. Despite the mid-season turmoil, the Breakers managed to fight back and win five straight to edge out the 36ers for the No. 4 seed in the playoffs. In the playoffs, the Breakers defeated first-placed Melbourne United in the semi-finals with a 2–0 sweep, moving on to their fifth NBL Grand Final appearance in six years. There they faced their archrivals the Perth Wildcats, but after losing Game 1, the Breakers fought out a Game 2 win in Auckland to level the series. They went on to lose Game 3 in Perth, earning their first grand final series loss and losing a series to the Wildcats for the first time in their playoff history.

Following the 2015–16 season, chief executive Richard Clarke and coach Dean Vickerman parted ways with the organisation, with Paul Henare stepping up from assistant to take the reins as head coach, while Dillon Boucher took control of the front office as general manager.

End of an era

2016–17 season
The Breakers went through many off-season changes in 2016. Joining Dean Vickerman in departure was Cedric Jackson and Tai Wesley, both of whom moved across the Tasman and joined Melbourne United. While retaining Abercrombie, Webster, Pledger and Vukona, the Breakers acquired the services of club legend Kirk Penney. With two vacant import spots, the Breakers signed Ben Woodside and Akil Mitchell. A strong New Zealand NBL contingent also stepped up from development player roles for the 2016–17 season, with Finn Delany, Shea Ili and Jordan Ngatai joining the club on full-time contracts.

Pre-season was anything but a breeze for the Breakers, as they lost Ili to a stress fracture in his back and had multiple players sit out games due to injury, including Penney (calf) and Webster (hip and back). As a result, the Breakers went 0–6 in the pre-season.

Over the first 20 games of the season, the Breakers went 8–12 while dealing with numerous injuries to Abercrombie, Webster and Woodside. As a result, Webster was placed on the long-term injury list and replaced in the line-up by import forward Paul Carter, while Woodside was replaced by David Stockton before he too succumbed to injury and was replaced by Kevin Dillard. Dillard helped salvage the Breakers' season by guiding them to four-straight wins, but after two Round 17 losses dropped them to 12–14, the Breakers' playoff hopes were shattered. Despite winning their last two games of the regular season, they fell short of a playoff spot, with their 14–14 record earning them fifth place.

2017–18 season
In March 2017, the Breakers severed ties with long-time guard Corey Webster. They subsequently signed import guard combo D. J. Newbill and Édgar Sosa for the 2017–18 season. The Breakers started the season in hot form, going 6–1 after five rounds thanks to the selflessness of Newbill and Sosa. Back-up guard Shea Ili also impressed early, as he cemented his place as a contender for most improved honours. With a win over the Perth Wildcats on 9 November, the Breakers moved to a 7–1 record, tying their best start in franchise history. They went on to defeat Perth again three days later, moving them to an 8–1 record. They moved to 9–1 with a win over the Brisbane Bullets on 19 November, as they headed into the 2019 FIBA Basketball World Cup qualification league-wide break atop the NBL ladder behind a nine-game win streak. However, the Breakers lost four out of their first five games following the break to drop to 10–5 following Round 10. After dropping to 11–6 heading into the new year, the Breakers signed former NBA player Rakeem Christmas in early January to bolster their squad. Despite this, they rounded out the month with a 13–9 record to sit in fourth place on the standings. They went on to finish the regular season with two defeats in the final round, earning them fourth place with a 15–13 record. They faced Melbourne United in the semi-finals, where they were defeated 2–0 following an 88–86 overtime loss in Game 2. Club legend Kirk Penney played his final NBL game in the Game 2 loss, finishing with a 17-point effort.

New era

2018–19 season
In 2018, a new regime was brought about at the Breakers organisation. In February, a consortium headed by former NBA player Matt Walsh became the majority shareholders via a newly formed company called Breakers Basketball Ltd, thus ending the 13-year Liz and Paul Blackwell ownership team. Next came the exodus of four of the franchise's most long-serving figures during the off-season: Alex Pledger and Mika Vukona departed for Melbourne and Brisbane respectively, Kirk Penney retired, and Paul Henare's 15 years as player and coach came to an end. In a total remake of their big man contingent, the Breakers also parted ways with Robert Loe. To coincide with the appointment of new head coach Kevin Braswell, the Breakers reacquired the services of Tai Wesley, a Guam-qualified American on the final year of his status as an unrestricted player. Braswell also lured back Tall Blacks star Corey Webster, and signed Jarrad Weeks and Majok Majok. The Breakers started the season with a 4–8 record following a five-game losing streak in late November and early December. As the season continued, Webster presented as a shadow of the figure who was once a premier scorer in the league, Abercrombie and Ili struggled with scoring, and Patrick Richard failed to live up to expectations. By mid-January, the Breakers had an 8–12 record following three consecutive losses, including losing to the last-placed Cairns Taipans. They went on to miss the finals with a sixth-place finish and a 12–16 record.

2019–20 season

For the 2019–20 season, the Breakers acquired the services of coach Dan Shamir, who in turn recruited seven new players, including US teen sensation R. J. Hampton as part of the NBL Next Stars program. As a result, long-time guard Shea Ili parted ways with the club. Along with the departure of Braswell as coach, general manager and long-time Breaker Dillon Boucher left the club, as did assistant coach Michael Fitchett.

The regular season began with just two wins from their first nine games. The club endured a number of injuries with four starting players (Finn Delany, Rob Loe, Scotty Hopson, and Corey Webster) all having extended time on the sidelines during the first half of the season. The club's attempt to cover for the injuries saw the signing of former NBA player Glen Rice Jr. However, Rice was suspended indefinitely by the club after just three games for off-court misdemeanors. Despite the controversy surrounding the club, the Breakers were playing to record home crowds and the 24 October encounter against the Illawarra Hawks—which saw Hampton matched-up with LaMelo Ball—was the most-watched game in NBL history with nearly two million views globally on Facebook. There were an estimated five million views on highlights from the game shared on social media platforms including Twitter, Instagram and YouTube. The club's playoff hopes looked dashed after first dropping to a 2–8 record and later a 4–10 record at the end of round 12. A remarkable turn around occurred from round 13 onwards with the Breakers reaching 8–10 by the end of December following a four-game winning streak, and then winning 11 of their last 14 games to finish the season 15–13, only missing the playoffs on points differential. The late-season push saw the Breakers being dubbed "the team no one wants to play in the playoffs".

2020–21 season
Due to the COVID-19 pandemic, the 2020–21 season start date was delayed until January 2021. As a result of the pandemic, the Breakers were forced to commit to being based in Australia for the majority of the season. They hosted a number of games as the 'home' team in Tasmania and only returned to play their last seven games in New Zealand in late May. A number of players missed large portions of the season due to injury and personal issues, including Robert Loe (20 games), Thomas Abercrombie (9), Corey Webster (8) and Tai Webster (7). The team also had a mid-season import change, with Lamar Patterson being replaced by Levi Randolph. They finished the season in eighth place with a 12–24 record.

2021–22 season
As a result of the pandemic, the Breakers were again forced to commit to being based in Australia, initially for at least the first half of the 2021–22 season. The team faced a COVID outbreak on the eve of the season, which they had to play through en route to a 0–6 start. They then had to concede defeat in their plan to return to New Zealand for home games over the back half of the season, basing themselves in Tasmania once again. They fell to 4–10 by mid February. With a 5–23 record, the Breakers had their worst season in their 19-year history.

2022–23 season
With the departure of Dan Shamir, assistant coach Mody Maor was elevated to head coach and helped the Breakers become championship contenders early in the 2022–23 season. The Breakers finished the regular season in second place with an 18–10 record, as they clinched their first playoff appearance in five years. They went on to reach their first grand final series since 2016. In game one against the Sydney Kings, the Breakers won 95–87. After losing games two and three, the Breakers tied the series with an 80–70 win at home in game four in front of their biggest ever crowd of 9,742. They went on to lose the deciding game five 77–69, as the Kings claimed the championship.

Season by season

Honour roll

Players

Current roster

All-time roster

Notable past players

Retired jerseys 

In February 2019, former owners Paul and Liz Blackwell were honoured by the Breakers with a banner in the rafters at Spark Arena.

Preseason games against NBA teams

Arena history

 North Shore Events Centre (2003–2018)
 Westpac Centre (2003–2004)
 Queens Wharf Events Centre (2003)
 Mystery Creek Events Centre (2003)
 The Trusts Arena (2004–2006; 2021)
 Spark Arena (2012–present)

References

External links

 
 "Rating all the NZ Breakers imports in the club's Australian NBL history" at stuff.co.nz
 "Turmoil for New Zealand Breakers with drinking incident on flight and star import axed" at stuff.co.nz
 "The New Zealand Breakers Have Descended Into Chaos" at basketballforever.com
 "Blinded by the light: NZ Breakers take credibility hit with Glen Rice Jr debacle" at stuff.co.nz
 "Championship History: The New Zealand Breakers" at nbl.com.au

 
National Basketball League (Australia) teams
Basketball teams in New Zealand
Basketball teams in Auckland
Basketball teams established in 2003
2003 establishments in New Zealand